Chad Doucette (born August 3, 1988) is a Canadian singer from East Chezzetcook, Nova Scotia, who finished 4th in the 2006 season of Canadian Idol.

Doucette, who auditioned in Sydney, Nova Scotia, made the Top 48 in season 3 of Canadian Idol, but was cut in the last round before the semi-finals. In season 4, he reached 4th place. The week he was eliminated from the competition, a record was set for the most votes cast on Canadian Idol, 4.3 million.

Songs that Doucette has performed on Canadian Idol include:

References

External links
 Official Myspace
 Chad Doucette at Canadian Idol website (archived)

Living people
1988 births
People from the Halifax Regional Municipality
Canadian Idol participants
Canadian people of Acadian descent